KVVN (1430 AM) is a radio station broadcasting a Vietnamese language format. Licensed to Santa Clara, California, United States, it serves the San Francisco Bay Area. The station is currently owned by Phuong Pham through licensee Pham Radio Communication LLC, owners of KVTO.

History
Founded by George B. Bailey and Greater Bay Area Broadcasters, the station obtained its first construction permit on March 8, 1963, and signed on as KGBA on December 15, 1963. KGBA featured programming from the Mutual Broadcasting System and weekly programs in German and Italian.

Following a $182,000 sale of the station to Royal Bear Broadcasters in the previous month, KGBA became KGNU on October 1, 1965. KGNU changed its network affiliation from Mutual to ABC in 1969.

Royal Bear Broadcasters sold KGNU and Stockton station KWG to Barnes Enterprises for $900,000 in June 1969, and KGNU's call sign changed to KEGL on July 1, 1969. KEGL had a full country and western music format until April 1971, when Barnes changed the station schedule to have religious music in mornings and Spanish programming in evenings. In March 1972, Barnes sold KEGL to Cascade Broadcasting for $316,000.

KEGL became KNTA on July 1, 1976. By 1979, KNTA broadcast exclusively in Spanish. In 1986, KNTA began broadcasting Oakland A's games in Spanish.

In February 1997, the Inner City Broadcasting Corporation purchased KNTA from Imperio Enterprises (formerly Cascade Broadcasting) for $2.2 million. After changing from Spanish to an Asian ethnic format, KNTA became KVVN on October 17, 1997.

After Inner City Broadcasting filed for bankruptcy, it sold KVVF and Berkeley station KVTO to YMF Media, a company backed by Magic Johnson and other investors in 2012. YMF Media sold both stations to Pham Radio Communications in 2013.

See also
 KAZA (AM)
 KZSJ

References

External links

VVN
Radio stations established in 1963
VVN
Santa Clara, California
1963 establishments in California